The Fram men's handball team is the men's handball section of Icelandic multi-sport club Fram from Reykjavík. Fram currently plays in the Úrvalsdeild karla. In 2006, they won their first championship in 34 years. They competed in EHF Champions League 2006-2007 the following season. They last won the national championship in 2013.

Trophies 
Icelandic Champions (10):
 1950, 1962, 1963, 1964, 1966, 1967, 1970, 1972, 2006, 2013
Icelandic Cup: (1):
 2000
Icelandic League Cup (1)::
 2008

References

External links
 Official site

Sport in Reykjavík
Fram (handball)